Golmakan or Gol Makan, also rendered as Gulmakan, may refer to:
 Gol Makan-e Baseri, Fars Province
 Gol Makan-e Qeshlaq, Fars Province
 Golmakan, Pasargad, Fars Province
 Golmakan, Razavi Khorasan
 Gol Makan, Zanjan
 Golmakan Rural District, in Razavi Khorasan Province